Stephen or Steven Cole may refer to:

 Stephen Cole (broadcaster) (born 1954), news presenter
 Stephen Cole (sociologist) (born 1941), professor of sociology at State University of New York, Stony Brook
 Stephen Cole (writer) (born 1971), author of children's books and science fiction
 Stephen V. Cole, American game designer
 Steven Cole (tenor), African-American opera singer
 Steven Cole, British actor
 Steve Cole, American saxophone player
 Stephen Cole (headmaster) (born 1952), British schoolmaster